Patrice Houssein (born 14 September 1977) is a Belgian field hockey player. He competed in the men's tournament at the 2008 Summer Olympics.

References

External links
 

1977 births
Living people
Belgian male field hockey players
Olympic field hockey players of Belgium
Field hockey players at the 2008 Summer Olympics
Field hockey players from Brussels